Alison Smith (born August 22, 1954) is a Canadian television and radio journalist and anchor.

Biography
She graduated in 1972 from Southern Okanagan Secondary School in Oliver, British Columbia, where her father Bruce was a guidance counsellor. She studied at the University of British Columbia in Vancouver and Ryerson University in Toronto.

By 1982, Smith was working as a reporter in Toronto. From 2005 to 2009, Smith was CBC Television's Washington correspondent, succeeding David Halton. Prior to her Washington assignment, she was the host of the network's morning show CBC News: Morning, and was also the anchor for The National from 1992 to 1995 when the program aired only on CBC Newsworld during which period CBC Prime Time News was CBC's flagship news show. Smith was also one of the first anchors for CBC Newsworld on the program This Day.

On September 28, 2009, Smith became anchor of CBC Radio One's The World at Six. On May 8, 2014, Smith announced her retirement from CBC. Smith's last day as anchor on The World at Six was June 26, 2014. In 2016, she joined CPAC as host of a new weekly series on international affairs.

References

External links
Alison Smith from cbc.ca

1954 births
Living people
Canadian television news anchors
Canadian radio news anchors
Journalists from British Columbia
People from Osoyoos
Toronto Metropolitan University alumni
University of British Columbia alumni
CBC Radio hosts
Canadian women radio journalists
20th-century Canadian journalists
21st-century Canadian journalists
Canadian women television journalists
20th-century Canadian women
Canadian women radio hosts